Supreme Dicks is an experimental rock group formed in 1984 by Jon Shere and Stuart Morris while students at Hampshire College.

The primary band members are Jon Shere, Daniel Oxenberg, Mark Hansen, Steve Shavel, and often Jim Spring. Other members at various times have included Holly Cat, Dan Kapelovitz, Jennifer Stefanisko, John Galvin III, and Dave Taub. Musicians who have joined them onstage include Beck and Ariel Pink. The band has performed with Dinosaur Jr., and toured with Neutral Milk Hotel, Kurt Vile, and Bonnie Prince Billy.

Their retrospective box set Breathing and Not Breathing was released on the Jagjaguwar label October 18, 2011.

The band played several shows in 2012, including three at South by Southwest, followed by a short tour with Kurt Vile. They were joined onstage for all of these shows by Holly Cat, known for the 1987 hit "I Wanna Be Like Madonna." The band toured Europe in 2013, and have continued to play shows sporadically, mostly in Los Angeles.

Discography

Studio albums
The Unexamined Life – Homestead Records (1993)
The Emotional Plague – Homestead Records (1996)

Singles and EPs
Sky Puddle (7") – Funky Mushroom Records (1992)
One Day West (7" split with One Small Good Thing) – Infinite Chug (1995)
This Is Not a Dick EP – Runt (1996)

Compilation albums
Working Man's Dick – Freek Records (1994)
Breathing and Not Breathing – Jagjaguwar Records (2011)

References

Indie rock musical groups from Massachusetts
Musical groups established in 1984
Musical groups disestablished in 1996
Musical groups reestablished in 2012
Jagjaguwar artists